1900 in sports describes the year's events in world sport.

American football
College championship
 College football national championship – Yale Bulldogs

Professional Championships
 Western Pennsylvania championship – Homestead Library & Athletic Club

Association football
England
 The Football League – Aston Villa 50 points, Sheffield United 48, Sunderland 41, Wolves 39, Newcastle United 36, Derby County 36
 FA Cup final – Bury 4–0 Southampton at Crystal Palace, London.
Germany
 German Football Association (i.e., the Deutscher Fußball-Bund or DFB) founded in Leipzig by representatives of 86 clubs (28 January).
 FC Bayern Munich founded on 27 February as Schwabinger Bayern at a meeting in Munich's Gisela Restaurant by dissident players from a club called MTV 1879.  The name was later changed to Bayern Roten (Reds).
Italy
 Lazio of Rome officially founded on January 9.
Olympic Games
 Football at the 1900 Summer Olympics:
 Upton Park FC (Great Britain)
 Club Française (France)
 Université de Bruxelles (Belgium)
Scotland
 Scottish Football League – Rangers
 Scottish Cup final – Celtic 4–3 Queen's Park at Ibrox Park
Uruguay
 Formation of the Uruguayan Football Association (Asociación Uruguaya de Fútbol or AUF)

Athletics
USA Outdoor Track and Field Championships
Jack Caffery wins the fourth running of the Boston Marathon

Australian rules football
VFL Premiership
 Melbourne Football Club wins the 4th VFL Premiership: Melbourne 4.10 (34) d Fitzroy 3.12 (30) at East Melbourne

Baseball
National championship
 National League championship – Brooklyn Superbas
Events
1900 – Six cities, Boston, Detroit, Milwaukee, Baltimore, Chicago and St. Louis, agree to form baseball's American League.
 The National League contracts from twelve to eight clubs in a circuit of eight cities that will persist through 1952.
 The Western League takes the name "American League" and moves teams into Chicago and Cleveland. The Chicago White Stockings win the pennant in this one season under the new name and the old minor league status.

Boxing
Lineal world champions
 World Heavyweight Championship – James J. Jeffries
 World Middleweight Championship – Tommy Ryan
 World Welterweight Championship – "Mysterious" Billy Smith → William "Matty" Matthews → Eddie Connolly → James "Rube" Ferns → William "Matty" Matthews 
 World Lightweight Championship – Frank Erne
 World Featherweight Championship – George Dixon → "Terrible" Terry McGovern
 World Bantamweight Championship – title vacant

Events
 11 May. After 23 rounds, James J. Jeffries knocks out James J. Corbett to retain the world heavyweight championship.

Cricket

Events
 Cricket is suspended in South Africa for the next three seasons on account of the Boer War.
 Yorkshire completes the County Championship season unbeaten, the first time this has happened since the start of the official championship in 1890.
 The Minor Counties Championship ends in a three-way tie between three future first-class clubs.
England
 County Championship – Yorkshire
 Minor Counties Championship – Durham, Glamorgan and Northamptonshire share the title
 Most runs – K S Ranjitsinhji 3065 @ 87.57 (HS 275) 
 Most wickets – Wilfred Rhodes 261 @ 13.81 (BB 8–23)
 Wisden Cricketers of the Year – R. E. Foster, Schofield Haigh, George Herbert Hirst, Tom Taylor, John Tunnicliffe 
Australia
 Sheffield Shield – New South Wales
 Most runs – Victor Trumper 721 @ 72.10 (HS 208)
 Most wickets – Monty Noble 37 @ 20.64 (BB 6–91)
India
 Bombay Presidency – Europeans shared with Parsees 
South Africa
 Currie Cup – not contested
West Indies
 Inter-Colonial Tournament – Barbados

Figure skating
World Figure Skating Championships
 World Men's Champion – Gustav Hügel (Austria)

Golf

Major tournaments
 British Open – John Henry Taylor
 U.S. Open – Harry Vardon
Other tournaments
 British Amateur – Harold Hilton
 British Ladies Amateur Golf Championship – Rhona Adair
 US Amateur – Walter Travis
 US Women's Amateur – Frances C. Griscom
 Canadian Amateur Championship – George Lyon
 Olympic Games (Men) – Charles Sands
 Olympic Games (Women) – Margaret Ives Abbott

Horse racing

England
 Grand National – Ambush II
 1,000 Guineas Stakes – Winifreda
 2,000 Guineas Stakes – Diamond Jubilee
 The Derby – Diamond Jubilee
 The Oaks – La Roche
 St. Leger Stakes – Diamond Jubilee
Australia
 Melbourne Cup – Clean Sweep
Canada
 Queen's Plate – Dalmoor
Ireland
 Irish Grand National – Mavis of Meath
 Irish Derby Stakes – Gallinaria
USA
 Kentucky Derby – Lieut. Gibson
 Preakness Stakes – Jean Bereaud
 Belmont Stakes – Ildrim

Ice hockey
Stanley Cup
 12–16 February — Montreal Shamrocks successfully defends the Stanley Cup, defeating Winnipeg Victorias in a best–of–three series 2–1.
 5–7 March — Montreal Shamrocks defeats Halifax Crescents in a Cup challenge best–of–three series 2–0.
Other events
 10 March — Montreal Shamrocks wins the Canadian Amateur Hockey League (CAHL) championship for the second successive season with a regular season record of 7–1.

Motor racing
Gordon Bennett Cup
 James Gordon Bennett, Jr., owner of the New York Herald newspaper and the International Herald Tribune, establishes the Gordon Bennett Cup. He hopes that the creation of an international event will drive automobile manufacturers to improve their cars. Each country is allowed to enter up to three cars, which must be fully built in the country that they represent and entered by that country's automotive governing body. International racing colours are first established in this event.
 The trophy is awarded annually until 1905, after which the Automobile Club de France (ACF) holds the first Grand Prix motor racing event on the Circuit de la Sarthe at Le Mans
 The inaugural Gordon Bennett Cup (Paris to Lyon) is won by Fernand Charron (France) driving a Panhard & Levassor
Paris-Toulouse-Paris Trail
 The Paris-Toulouse-Paris Trail is run on 25–28 July over 1347 km and won by Alfred Velghe (France) driving a Mors in a time of 20:50:09.  The race is in retrospect sometimes referred to as the V Grand Prix de l'ACF.

Olympic Games
1900 Summer Olympics
 The 1900 Summer Olympics takes place in Paris but the Olympic status of the games is underplayed and many competitors do not realise that they have participated in the modern Olympics.
 Women take part in the modern Olympics for the first time. The first sportswomen to compete in the games are Mme. Brohy and Mlle. Ohnier of France in croquet. The first female champion is Charlotte Cooper of Great Britain in tennis.
 France wins the most medals (100), and the most gold medals (25).

Rowing
The Boat Race
 31 March — Cambridge wins the 57th Oxford and Cambridge Boat Race

Rugby league
England
 Championship – not contested
 Challenge Cup final – Swinton 16–8 Salford at Fallowfield Stadium, Manchester
 Lancashire League Championship – Runcorn
 Yorkshire League Championship – Bradford FC

Rugby union
Home Nations Championship
 18th Home Nations Championship series is won by Wales

Speed skating
Speed Skating World Championships
 Men's All-round Champion – Edvard Engelsaas (Norway)

Tennis
Events
 9 February — Davis Cup competition is established, the inaugural competition being called the International Lawn Tennis Challenge and involving only Great Britain and the USA. 
 15 August — Dwight F. Davis and Holcombe Ward win the first Davis Cup over Englishmen E.D.Black and H.R.Barett. (3-0, when the last match was halted by rain after Davis won the first set 9-7) 
England
 Wimbledon Men's Singles Championship – Reginald Doherty (GB) defeats Sydney Smith (GB) 6–8 6–3 6–1 6–2
 Wimbledon Women's Singles Championship – Blanche Bingley Hillyard (GB) defeats Charlotte Cooper-Sterry (GB) 4–6 6–4 6–4
France
 French Men's Singles Championship – Paul Aymé (France) defeats André Prévost (France): details unknown
 French Women's Singles Championship – Hélène Prévost (France) wins: details unknown
USA
 American Men's Singles Championship – Malcolm Whitman (USA) defeats William Larned (USA) 6–4 1–6 6–2 6–2
 American Women's Singles Championship – Myrtle McAteer (USA) defeats Edith Parker (USA) 6–2 6–2 6–0
Davis Cup
 1900 International Lawn Tennis Challenge –  3–0  at Longwood Cricket Club (grass) Boston, United States

References

 
Sports by year